Acrocercops pnosmodiella (marbleseed leafminer) is a moth of the family Gracillariidae. It is known from Québec, Canada, and Colorado and California in the United States).

The larvae feed on Onosmodium species, including Onosmodium carolinianum and Onosmodium molle. They mine the leaves of their host plant.

References

External links
 mothphotographersgroup
 Acrocercops at microleps.org

pnosmodiella
Moths of North America
Moths described in 1902